Findon is a semi-rural clustered village and civil parish in the Arun District of West Sussex, England, 4 miles (6.4 km) north of Worthing.

Governance
An electoral ward in the same name. This ward stretches south west to Patching with a total ward population as at the 2011 census of 2,557.

Geography
The parish is on the slopes of and between two hills: Cissbury with its Iron Age hill fort to the east and a steep knoll Church Hill to the west. A further escarpment to the West and North stretches along the borders of the area. Near Muntham Court to the west of the village can be found a late Iron Age and Romano-British settlement site designated as a scheduled monument. The village is now bypassed by the A24 as it crosses the South Downs: the bypass was constructed in 1938. A modern settlement to the south of the village, inside the boundary of the Borough of Worthing is called Findon Valley.

Localities
Contiguously to the south-east is the sole sub-locality,  Nepcote which faces Nepcote Green, the public parkland venue for the annual Findon sheep fair held in early September. Originally a charter fair dating from as early as 1261 many thousands of sheep were penned on the green for sale in earlier times. Wooden hurdles for pens were stored in the purpose built Wattle House on the green which also included living accommodation. Nowadays the fair is a sheep show and funfair.

Amenities
The parish church, dedicated to St John the Baptist, stands to the west of the village and the A24 road near the 18th century mansion Findon Place. The church is built of flint to an unusual design, the nave and north aisle having been given a single span roof with king-posts resting on the arcade, probably in the 15th century. The screen is a rare 13th century example, but heavily restored. There are four public houses, the Gun Inn, the Black Horse, the Village House, the Snooty Fox (part of the Findon Manor Hotel) all of which are located in High Street. The village has a small primary school, situated on School Hill, called Saint John the Baptist. It boasts many annual events, including a fireworks display and May Day celebrations.

Sport and recreation
The Monarch's Way long-distance footpath crosses the village which is the only significant settlement on the route between Arundel and Bramber.

Culture
Nationally famous stage and screen Actress, Nancy Price, lived with her husband for many years in 'Arcana', a house in Heather Lane, till her death, in 1970.

References

External links

Villages in West Sussex
Arun District